Argaeus II was a pretender to the Macedonian crown. He may have been a Lynkestian ruler.

War with Amyntas III 
Argaeus II was a son of Archelaus I (ruled 413–399 BC). With the assistance of the Illyrians, Argaeus II expelled King Amyntas III from his dominions in 393 BCE and kept possession of the throne for about a year.  With the aid of the Thessalians, Amyntas III later succeeded in expelling Argaeus II and recovering a part of his kingdom in 392 BCE.

Again pretender? 

35 years later, in 359, another Argaeus or Argeus appeared as a pretender to the throne; he may have been the same person as Argaeus II of Macedon. This Argaeus had persuaded the Athenians to support his claim to the Macedonian throne, but Philip II, who had just succeeded to the regency of the kingdom, persuaded the Athenians to remain inactive.

With a force of mercenaries, some Macedonian exiles and a number of Athenian troops (who were permitted to join the Macedonians by their general, Manlias), Argaeus made an attempt to take Aegae, but was repulsed. On his retreat to Methone, he was intercepted by Philip and defeated. Argaeus was either killed in the battle or executed afterward.

References

Bibliography

4th-century BC Macedonian monarchs
4th-century BC rulers
People who died under the reign of Philip II of Macedon
Pretenders of Macedonia (ancient kingdom)
Executed royalty of Macedonia (ancient kingdom)
Old Macedonian kingdom
Executed monarchs